Getting to Know the Big, Wide World is a 1978 Soviet drama film directed by Kira Muratova.

Plot 
The film in a special form of cinema language shows the passionate story of a love triangle.

Cast 
 Nina Ruslanova as Lyuba
  as Mikhail
 Aleksey Zharkov as Nikolay
 Lyudmila Gurchenko as Stranger
 Natalya Leble as Galya
 Vladimir Pozhidayev
 Lena Scelgunova as Zoya
 Natasha Scelgunova as Vera

References

External links 
 

1978 films
1970s Russian-language films
Soviet drama films
1978 drama films